Ebersbach is a municipality in the district of Meißen, in Saxony, Germany.

Municipality subdivisions 
Ebersbach includes the following subdivisions:
Beiersdorf
Bieberach
Cunnersdorf
Ermendorf
Freitelsdorf
Göhra
Hohndorf
Kalkreuth
Lauterbach
Marschau
Naunhof
Reinersdorf
Rödern

References 

Municipalities in Saxony
Meissen (district)